Brems is an unincorporated community in Center Township, Starke County, in the U.S. state of Indiana.

History
A post office was established at Brems in 1911, and remained in operation until it was discontinued in 1924.

Geography

References

Unincorporated communities in Starke County, Indiana
Unincorporated communities in Indiana